The Protector (also known as Exit 19), is an American police procedural drama television series starring Ally Walker as Gloria Sheppard, a single mother who struggles to maintain the balance between her personal and professional life as an LAPD homicide detective.

The series was broadcast in the United States on the cable channel Lifetime, and is a co-production between ABC Studios and Wass-Stein Productions. It premiered on June 12, 2011, and ended on September 19, 2011. It was created by Michael Nankin and Jeffrey Jackson Bell.

On September 8, 2011, Lifetime announced it would not renew the series for a second season. The series finale aired on September 19, 2011.

Overview
The series follows Gloria Sheppard, an LAPD detective attached to the Robbery-Homicide Division. A recent divorcée and single mother, Gloria has to perform her duties as an LAPD homicide detective while raising her twin sons. Gloria's brother, Davey Sheppard, whose house she recently moved into, helps to raise her two sons Nick and Leo. While at work, Gloria must solve some of Los Angeles' highest profile crimes with the assistance of her partner, Detective Michelle Dulcett as well as Detectives Ramon "Romeo" Rush, Buerge, and Van Stone, while being overseen by her commanding officer, Lieutenant Felix Valdez.

Cast and characters

Main
 Ally Walker as Gloria Sheppard – An LAPD Detective attached to the Robbery-Homicide Division.
 Tisha Campbell-Martin as Michelle Dulcett – An LAPD Detective II. She is Gloria Sheppard's partner in the Robbery-Homicide Division.
 Miguel Ferrer as Felix Valdez – An LAPD Lieutenant. He is Gloria Sheppard's superior officer in the Robbery-Homicide Division.
 Chris Payne Gilbert as Davey "Dave" Sheppard – Gloria Sheppard's brother and uncle to Leo and Nick Sheppard.
 Terrell Tilford as Ramon "Romeo" Rush – An LAPD police officer and later Detective, attached to the Robbery-Homicide Division.
 Thomas Robinson as Leo Sheppard – Gloria Sheppard's youngest son.
 Sage Ryan as Nicholas "Nick" Sheppard – Gloria Sheppard's oldest son.

Recurring
 Larry Joe Campbell as Detective Ted Buerge – An LAPD Detective attached to the Robbery-Homicide Division.
 James Hanlon as Detective Joe Van Stone – An LAPD Detective attached to the Robbery-Homicide Division.
 Karly Rothenberg as Marlene – Loyal secretary to Lt. Valdez
 Marianne Chambers as Nora Fitzpatrick
 McKinley Freeman as Patrick 'Trick' Purcell

Development and production
Originally known as Exit 19, The Protector was initially developed by Jeffrey Jackson Bell, based on a script written by Michael Nankin, in late 2007. In early 2008, CBS placed an order for a pilot presentation for Exit 19. Bell wrote the pilot. Nankin was attached to the project as director, with Jeffrey Jackson Bell, Nina Wass, and Gene Stein serving as executive producers. The pilot was a co-production of ABC Studios, CBS Television Studios, and Wass-Stein Productions. It was described as being about "a quirky homicide detective on the mean streets of Manhattan who also is a single mom to two kids in the suburbs on Long Island." Geena Davis was the first to be cast in the pilot as 'Gloria'. She also served as co-executive producer. Next to join the pilot was Matthew Lillard as Gloria's younger brother. Rosie Perez, Ramon Rodriguez, and Amy Farrington were the last actors to be cast, with Perez playing 'Lorna', Gloria's partner on the NYPD, Rodriguez playing 'a smart flirty cop who works with Gloria and Lorna', and Farrington playing Gloria's neighbor. On May 10, 2008, it was announced that CBS had decided not to pick up the pilot to series.

In July 2009, Lifetime announced it was redeveloping the pilot. In June 2010, the network placed a pilot order.

Casting announcements began in November 2010, with Ally Walker first to be cast. Walker portrays Gloria Sheppard, a Los Angeles Police Department homicide detective who is juggling her demanding personal and professional lives while raising two children. Next to join the series was Tisha Campbell-Martin and Chris Payne Gilbert, with Campbell-Martin playing Michelle Dulcett, Gloria's smart and vivacious partner, and Gilbert playing Davey Sheppard, Gloria's younger brother, a recovering alcoholic, with whom she shares the house the two co-own. Last to be cast was Miguel Ferrer playing Lieutenant Felix Valdez, Gloria's boss.

The network green lighted the series on February 7, 2011, with an order of 13 hour-long episodes. The series is a co-production between ABC Studios and Wass-Stein Productions.

On May 3, 2011, during the network's 2011–2012 upfronts presentation, Lifetime announced that Exit 19 had been retitled The Protector and would debut in the summer of 2011.

On September 8, 2011, Lifetime announced it would not renew the series for a second season. The series finale aired on September 19, 2011.

Episodes

International broadcasting

Reception

Critical reception
The Protector has received mixed to average reviews, earning a score of 53 on Metacritic. The New York Daily News said of the series: "Where Army Wives can get soapy at times, it also starts with a premise that sets it apart. The Protector doesn't start with that advantage." The New York Times gave a mixed review: "Ms. Walker is an appealing actress with a strong presence, but in the pilot, at least, her character isn't as well formed or well written as other tough-talking television dames." The Pittsburgh Post-Gazette gave the pilot a positive review:

The Protector is fairly routine plot-wise but the breezy tone—conveyed through upbeat music and snappy dialogue—and strong, collegial performances make this series a welcome summer diversion.

Ratings
The pilot episode premiered with 1.90 million total viewers, scoring 0.9 million viewers in the 18–49 demographic.

References

External links

2011 American television series debuts
2011 American television series endings
2010s American crime drama television series
2010s American police procedural television series
English-language television shows
Fictional portrayals of the Los Angeles Police Department
Lifetime (TV network) original programming
Television series by ABC Studios
Television shows set in Los Angeles
American detective television series